Nilgiri Parbat is a mountain of the Garhwal Himalaya in Uttarakhand India and rises to an elevation of   with a prominence is . It is 91st highest located entirely within Uttarakhand. Nanda Devi, is the highest mountain in this category. It lies 6.7 km NW of Ratabon and 9.4 km south of Deoban. It lies 6.3 km SSW of Mandir Parbat its nearest higher neighbor. It is located 12.7 km NNW of Hathi Parbat  and 11.2 km north lies Mana Peak .

Climbing history

In 1937 Frank Smythe climbed Nilgiri Parbat, completing the first ascent.
In 1962 An Indian expedition, led by Captain Jagjit Singh, attempted Mana Peak and Nilgiri Parbat in Garhwal. Failed in their two successive attempt to climb Nilgiri Parbat in the post-monsoon period. but the party suffered severe frostbite. 

An  Indian team led by V. Shankar, Vinay Hegde, Vivek Hegde and Dinesh Shertate attempted but failed due to bad weather. They set up Base Camp 3km below the snout of the Khulia Garvia Glacier. They set up Camp III near the northwest ridge at 5640 meters. After two days of heavy snowfall, and bad weather they called off their attempt. On June 7 1994 An Indian Army expedition led by Brigadier Pushkar Chand successfully climbed Nilgiri Parbat when  Lance Naik A. Arunagiri, Havildar S. Kumar, Sepoy Dev Lal and Havildar Major Satish reached the summit.

Neighboring and subsidiary peaks
neighboring peaks of Nilgiri Parbat:

 Abi Gamin
 Kamet 
 Chamrao Parbat I 
 Deoban 
 Hathi Parbat 
 Mana Peak 
 Mana Northwest 
 Bidhan

Glaciers and rivers

Khulia Garvia Glacier lies on the western side of Nilgiri Parbat and Bank kund Glacier lies on the northern side. On the eastern side lies Ratabon Glacier and on the southern side lies Tipra Bamak. Amrit Ganga comes from Bank kund glacier after a short run it joins Dhauli Ganga at Gamshali which later joins Alaknanda River at Vishnu Prayag one of the main tributaries of river Ganga. Alaknanda later joins Bhagirathi River the other main tributaries of river Ganga at Dev Prayag and became Ganga there after.
Khulia Garvia Glacier drains down to Saraswati River and Saraswati River joins Alaknanda near Mana village. Ratabon drains down to Amrit Ganga . In the south Pushpawati River joins Bhyundar Ganga near Ghagharia and became known as Lakshman Ganga that later joins Alaknanda at Govindghat.

References

Mountains of Uttarakhand
Six-thousanders of the Himalayas
Geography of Chamoli district